Taneja Group was an analyst and consulting group headquartered in Hopkinton, Massachusetts. It was founded in 2003 by Arun Taneja, and provided analysis and consulting for the technology industry. Specializing in storage and virtualization, it worked with companies such as Dell, Nutanix, VMware, Oracle, and HP.

References

External links

Companies based in Middlesex County, Massachusetts
Technology companies established in 2003
2003 establishments in Massachusetts